Community Outreach Academy Elementary is a Charter Elementary School located in McClellan Park, California, United States.  Community Outreach Academy was founded in 2004 with one class per grade level..  Since then, the school has grown tremendously.  There were over 1200 students enrolled in the 2014–2015 school year.  The school serves the Sacramento area's Slavic Community with 98% of their enrolled students coming from countries of the former Soviet Union.  The school is very popular among the Slavic Community because it offers Russian Language classes as part of their Core curriculum.  Every year there is a waiting list to get into the school, with the district providing a "lottery" to allow a fair way for students to enroll.  The school is WASC (Western Area Schools and Colleges) accredited.  WASC is the most difficult accreditation to receive.  All of the teachers at COA are state credentialed and certificated.

COA Elementary employs over 130 people, about 50% of which are also of the Slavic community.  All staff members are held accountable for the success of every student.  They employ a lot of Para Educators for Enrichment Blocks in their classes to provide a well-rounded education for all students.  COA Elementary relies heavily on Parent Volunteers.  All parents are required to volunteer 12 hours every school year.  There is a large focus on families at COA, they often have workshops for parents to be involved in to encourage involvement in their students' education.  This also helps those families who struggle with the English language.

References

External links
Official website
Sacbee.com

Charter elementary schools in California
Schools in Sacramento County, California
Educational institutions established in 2004
2004 establishments in California